In enzymology, a 5-methyltetrahydropteroyltriglutamate—homocysteine S-methyltransferase is an enzyme that catalyzes the chemical reaction

5-methyltetrahydropteroyltri-L-glutamate + L-homocysteine  tetrahydropteroyltri-L-glutamate + L-methionine

Thus, the two substrates of this enzyme are 5-methyltetrahydropteroyltri-L-glutamate and L-homocysteine, whereas its two products are tetrahydropteroyltri-L-glutamate and L-methionine. This enzyme participates in methionine metabolism.  It has 2 cofactors: orthophosphate,  and zinc.

Nomenclature 

This enzyme belongs to the family of transferases, specifically those transferring one-carbon group methyltransferases.  The systematic name of this enzyme class is 5-methyltetrahydropteroyltri-L-glutamate:L-homocysteine S-methyltransferase. Other names in common use include tetrahydropteroyltriglutamate methyltransferase, homocysteine methylase, methyltransferase, tetrahydropteroylglutamate-homocysteine transmethylase, methyltetrahydropteroylpolyglutamate:homocysteine methyltransferase, cobalamin-independent methionine synthase, methionine synthase (cobalamin-independent), and MetE.

Structure 

The enzyme from Escherichia coli consists of two alpha8-beta8 (TIM) barrels positioned face to face and thought to have evolved by gene duplication.  The active site lies between the tops of the two barrels, the N-terminal barrel binds 5-methyltetrahydropteroyltri-L-glutamic acid and the C-terminal barrel binds homocysteine.  Homocysteine is coordinated to a zinc ion, as initially suggested by spectroscopy and mutagenesis .

References

Further reading 

 
 
 
 
 

EC 2.1.1
Zinc enzymes
Enzymes of known structure
Protein families